Ferenc Cseh (Budapest, 22 October 1943 – San Jose, California, 16 July 2018) was a Hungarian sprint kayaker who competed in the late 1960s. He won two medals at the 1966 ICF Canoe Sprint World Championships in East Berlin with silver in the K-1 4 x 500 m and a bronze in the K-2 1000 m events.

References

Hungarian male canoeists
ICF Canoe Sprint World Championships medalists in kayak
1943 births
2018 deaths
20th-century Hungarian people